Muhammad Talab Hilal was a Syrian military officer and politician. He was the Minister of Supply in the Ba'athist government of Yusuf Zuayyin and after Zuayyin's resignation in 1968, also under Nureddin al-Atassi. In 1971 Hilal took part in a delegation consisting of Hafez Al Assad and other Syrian Ministers visiting Moscow, Soviet Union. Under Assad, he served as a deputy Prime Minister, Minister of Agrarian Reform and acting Minister of the Interior. at different times. Before he was the governor of Hama and the chief of police in the Governorate of al-Hasakah. While he was the chief of police Hasakah, Hilal wrote a book on Syria's Jazira region which was influential for the Syrian government's "Arab Belt" in the Kurdish populated regions in Syria. He denied an eventual existence of a Kurdish language and ethnicity and supported the shutting down of Kurdish schools also when they taught in the Arabic language. He deemed the existence of the Kurds in the vicinity of the Arab nation a similar threat as the Jews in Israel.   

Hilal completed his study on the National, Political, and Social Study of the Province of Jazira in November 1963. In view of the Kurdish uprising in Iraq he warned of a similar situation in Syria and suggested the creation of an Arab populated area in the border region between Syria, Turkey and Iraq. 

Hilal produced a twelvefold strategy to achieve the Arabization of the al-Jazira Province. The steps were:

 (1) eviction and resettlement of Kurds
 (2) deprivation of all education for Kurds
 (3)  removal of Kurds from employment
 (4)  the reevaluation of the Syrian citizenships of Kurds also holding a Turkish citizenship
 (5)  encouragement of intra-Kurdish factionalism in order to divide and rule
 (6) Arab settlements in former Kurdish lands
 (7) colonization  "pure and nationalist Arabs" to be settled in Syrian Kurdistan so Kurds might be "watched until their dispersion"
 (8) military involvement by divisions stationed in the zone of the cordon would guaranty that the dispersion of the Kurds and the settlement of Arabs would take place according to plans drawn up by the government
 (9)  collective farms are to be established by Arab settlers equipped with "armament and training"
 (10) prohibition of "anybody ignorant of the Arabic language exercising the right to vote or stand for office"
 (11) Kurdish religious dignitaries were to be expelled to the south and replaced with Arabs
 (12) "a vast anti-Kurdish campaign amongst the Arabs" to be undertaken by the state

References

Notes 

Syrian politicians
Syrian military personnel
Kurds in Syria
Syrian Arab nationalists